El conquistador del fin del mundo (The conqueror of the end of the world, often shortened to "El Conquis") is an adventure reality TV show created by Euskal Telebista (ETB).

Its contestants are divided into teams that fight not only against the roughness of the land and the climate but also against the different events which they encounter. The living conditions are difficult, having to deal with the cold, heat, rain, insects, hunger and thirst. Physical endurance as well as the capacity to live with strangers are essential to survive this adventure.

Program characteristics 
Its contestants are divided in groups that compete between them with different events apart from the climate, hunger, thirst and so on. The physical condition and the capability to live with strangers are also very important in order to win this competition.

This program is based on other previous ones like Basetxea and Conquistadores del fin del mundo.

In its first edition in 2005, twelve out of its sixteen contestants where from the Basque Country and the other four from Argentina, but with Basque roots. The goal was to bring the ikurriña (Basque flag), to the Les Éclaireus lighthouse in the Beagle Channel. Early in the year 2008, an Argentinian version was produced. Since the seventh edition (2011), the final's emplacement changed. In 2011, the final was held on the Perito Moreno Glacier, place which would be repeated in 2014 (10th edition). In 2012 (8th edition) and 2013 (9th edition), it was held at Iguazu Falls, and in 2015 (11th edition), in the Pacific Ocean, at the mouth of the Palena River.

After that, the program's production changed place, and it has never returned to Argentina ever since. In 2016 it took part in Colombia, in the Amazonas rainforest. For this reason, the name of the program itself was changed to "El conquistador del Amazonas." Ever since, the program's name has been "El conquistador del Caribe" (The conqueror of the Caribbean), with the exception of the fifteenth edition (2019), in which it was called "El conquistador del Pacífico" (The conqueror of the Pacific). From the 12th to the 14th editions (2016-2018), the program was shot in Colombia, in the 15th edition (2019) it was shot in Panama, in the Pearl Islands, and ever since, the last three editions have been shot in the Dominican Republic, in the Los Haitises National Park.

The program does not only count with the participation of anonymous people; professional athletes have also participated, as in the case of David Seco and Zuriñe Rodríguez. In the early editions, prominent Basque sportspeople (such as José Luis Korta and Juanito Oiarzabal) have acted as team captains, but in the last editions, successful or notorious ex-participants have been called as captains more often.

Reception 
It was awarded as the Best Entertainment Autonomic Program of 2008 by the Academy of Spanish Television.
It is usually considered one of the most extreme shows on television because of the combination of extreme events, survival and cohabitation, and also because of the format of the reality, that changes every year surprising the contestants and the audience. For all of that, each edition gathers more followers, not only in the Basque Country, but also in other provinces, achieving assessments 25% higher than the average of the channel.

Controversies 
Some groups pro animal rights reported that the program encourages animal mistreatment in some of its events by killing chickens, frogs, worms and fish or even for feeding an animal until it threw up. The Aranzadi Science Society has also reported that an inoffensive protected species of snake was killed, as well as some other animals under the same circumstances.

Past editions 
For a more extensive review on every edition, check the annex to the Spanish Wikipedia page of El Conquis here: .

References

Bibliography 
 
 Blog oficial de El conquistador del fin del mundo en EiTB

Spanish reality television series
EITB original programming
2005 Spanish television series debuts